The Prix Mallarmé is a poetry prize awarded each year by the Académie Mallarmé to a French speaking poet. To be eligible for the prize the poet must have published a piece in the year concerned, even though the prize does not reward a specific piece of poetry but the author's work all along his career as a whole. The prize may only be won once.

The prize is awarded on the occasion of the book fair which takes place in Brive-la-Gaillarde, in the département of Corrèze, région Limousin, France.  The cash prize amounts to €3,811 (25,000 FF).  Over the past three years it has been financed through sponsorship from the company ISS; previously it was sponsored by the Mairie of Brives.

Winners
This is an incomplete list of authors having won the prize:

Académie Mallarmé
The Académie Mallarmé (Mallarmé Academy) was founded in 1937. It is a French not-for-profit association (known in French as an association loi de 1901, a "1901 law association"), founded in commemoration of Stéphane Mallarmé, by people who knew him.

Its main objective is the promotion of poetry, and for a long time it was presided over by Guillevic and Alain Bosquet. It consists of thirty French or French-speaking members and 15 foreign correspondents. Notable members of the Académie include Jean Orizet, Marie-Claire Bancquart, Lionel Ray, Claude-Michel Cluny, François Montmaneix, Robert Sabatier, Jean Rousselot, Michel Deguy, Charles Dobzinski, Philippe Jones, Jean-Michel Maulpoix, Henri Meschonnic, Pierre Oster, Vénus Khoury-Ghata; and the foreign correspondents are Ismaël Kadaré, Seamus Heaney and Andrei Vossnessenski.

The Academy seeks to promote poetry and organises poetry readings as well as the annual award of the Mallarmé prize. The Academy also seeks to promote the work of Stéphane Mallarmé, which is now in the public domain (since he died more than a hundred years ago).

References

French poetry awards
Awards established in 1939
1939 establishments in France